Frank Gray (1901-1993) was an Australian rugby league footballer who played in the 1920s.

Playing career
Gray was a talented sportsman who excelled at running, cycling,feather weight boxing and rugby league. He is remembered as a foundation player for the St. George club in their debut season in 1921. 

He often captained the St. George reserve grade team during a four-season career at the Dragons. A durable player, Gray played in the backs and forwards and in most positions. Gray also played for Western Suburbs Magpies and Glebe and was a younger brother of the famous Glebe stalwart Bert Gray.

References

1901 births
1993 deaths
St. George Dragons players
Western Suburbs Magpies players
Australian rugby league players
Rugby league hookers
Rugby league props
Rugby league five-eighths
Rugby league players from Sydney
Glebe rugby league players